Galegeae is a tribe in the flowering plant family Fabaceae, subfamily Faboideae. The tribe is found mostly in the northern hemisphere, but can also be found in Australia, Africa, and South America. Recent molecular phylogenetic work has determined that tribe Galegeae is paraphyletic, and that its members are scattered throughout the IR-lacking clade.

Classification
The tribe Galegeae contains roughly twenty genera.  Indigofereae and Psoraleeae were once included as subtribes, but have since been elevated as distinct tribes.

Subtribe Astragalinae
Carmichaelinae Clade

 Carmichaelia R. Br.
 Clianthus Sol. ex Lindl.
 Montigena (Hook. f.) Heenan
 †Streblorrhiza Endl.
 Swainsona Salisb.

Coluteinae Clade

 Astragalus L.
 Biserrula L.
 Colutea  L.
 Eremosparton Fisch. & C.A.Mey.
 Erophaca Boiss.
 Lessertia  DC.
 Ophiocarpus (Bunge) Ikonn.
 Phyllolobium Fisch. ex Spreng.
 Podlechiella Maassoumi & Kaz. Osaloo
 Sphaerophysa DC.
 Sutherlandia R.Br.
incertae sedis

 Oreophysa (Bunge ex Boiss.) Bornm.
 Oxytropis DC.
 Smirnowia Bunge

Subtribe Galeginae
 Galega L.

Subtribe Glycyrrhizinae
 Glycyrrhiza L.

Molecular phylogenetic analysis have found tribe Galegeae to be polyphyletic, with the three subtribes recovered in different  part of the inverted repeat-lacking clade.

Notes

References

External links

 
Fabaceae tribes